The Indian locomotive class XC was a class of heavy axle load  "Pacific" type steam locomotives used on  broad gauge lines in British India, and then in post-partition India and Pakistan.

The 72 members of the class were built in the United Kingdom between 1928 and 1931, some of them by William Beardmore & Co in Glasgow, Scotland, and the rest by Vulcan Foundry in Newton-le-Willows, Lancashire, England.

Upon partition of India in 1947, a total of 22 members of the class went to Pakistan. The other 50 remained in India.

Preservation
None of the XC's have survived preservation but while Colin Garratt visited the railways once, he recalls one was attempted to be hidden from scrappers torch but plans to save the last XC came to a naught when it was soon found and cut up, however it is unknown if any railway enthusiasts will ever build a new build of one, note to fact that India is poor and doesn't or can't afford money to make new builds, or should enthusiasts look to England to build one, but however this has never been started,

See also

Rail transport in India#History
History of rail transport in Pakistan
Indian Railways
Locomotives of India
Pakistan Railways

References

Bibliography

External links

 – features an image of a class XC locomotive on the Kurrong Bridge
 – features an image of a class XC locomotive at Lahore Junction

Railway locomotives introduced in 1928
XC
XC
Vulcan Foundry locomotives
William Beardmore and Company locomotives
4-6-2 locomotives
5 ft 6 in gauge locomotives
Passenger locomotives
Scrapped locomotives